Clonmines was a constituency represented in the Irish House of Commons until its abolition on 1 January 1801. It was a rotten borough associated with the deserted Norman borough of Clonmines, in southwest County Wexford.

History
In the Patriot Parliament of 1689 summoned by James II, Clonmines was represented with two members.

Members of Parliament
 1634–1635: James Brien and John Cullen
 1639–1649: disenfranchised - no record
 1661–1666: Francis Harvey and John Edgeworth

Notes

References

Bibliography

Constituencies of the Parliament of Ireland (pre-1801)
Historic constituencies in County Wexford
1800 disestablishments in Ireland
Constituencies disestablished in 1800